Turritella maculata is a species of sea snail, a marine gastropod mollusk in the family Turritellidae.

Description
The length of the shell varies between 30 mm and 10 mm.

Distribution
The marine species occurs off Australia; in the Indian Ocean and in the Red Sea.

References

 Melvill, J. C. (1928). The Marine Mollusca of the Persian Gulf, Gulf of Oman, and North Arabian Sea, as evidenced mainly through the collections of Captain F. W. Townsend, 1893–1914. - Addenda, Corrigenda, and Emendanda. Proceedings of the Malacological Society of London. Volume 43, Part 3 (November 1928), pp. 93–117.
 Haas, F. (1952) Shells collected by the Peabody Museum Expedition to the Near East, 1950 1. Mollusks from the Persian Gulf. The Nautilus 65:114-116

External links
 Reeve, L.A. (1849). Monograph of the genus Turritella. In: Conchologia Iconica. vol. 5, pl. 1-11 and unpaginated text. L. Reeve & Co., London.
 Adams A. & Reeve L. (1848-1850). Mollusca. In A. Adams (ed.), The zoology of the voyage of H.M.S. Samarang, under the command of Captain Sir Edward Belcher, C.B., F.R.A.S., F.G.S., during the years 1843-1846. Reeve & Benham, London, x + 87 pp., 24 pls. [i-x, 1-24, pls 1-9 (1848); 25-87, pls 10-24 (1850) 
 Watson, R.B. (1880). Mollusca of H. M. S. 'Challenger' expedition. Part VI. Turritellidae. Journal of the Linnean Society - Zoology. 15: 217-230
 Tryon G.W., jr. (1886). Manual of conchology, structural and systematic, with illustrations of the species. (1)8: Naticidae, Calyptraeidae, Turritellidae, Vermetidae, Caecidae, Eulimidae, Turbonillidae, Pyramidellidae. pp. 1-461, pls. 1-79
 Smith E.A. (1891). On a collection of marine shells from Aden, with sorne remarks upon the relationship of the molluscan fauna of the Red Sea and the Mediterranean. Proceedings of the Zoological Society of London. (1891): 390-436, pl. 33
 Gastropods.com: Turritella maculata

Turritellidae
Gastropods described in 1849